George G. Moore (July 2, 1844 – November 26, 1925) was a Union Army soldier during the American Civil War. He received the Medal of Honor for gallantry during the Battle of Fisher's Hill near Strasburg, Virginia fought September 21–22, 1864. The battle was one of the engagements of the Valley Campaigns of 1864.

Medal of Honor citation
“The President of the United States of America, in the name of Congress, takes pleasure in presenting the Medal of Honor to Private George G. Moore, United States Army, for extraordinary heroism on 22 September 1864, while serving with Company D, 11th West Virginia Infantry, in action at Fisher's Hill, Virginia, for capture of flag.”

See also

List of Medal of Honor recipients
List of American Civil War Medal of Honor recipients: M-P

References

External links
Military Times Hall of Valor
Findagrave entry

1844 births
1925 deaths
People from Tyler County, West Virginia
People of West Virginia in the American Civil War
People of Colorado in the American Civil War
Union Army soldiers
United States Army Medal of Honor recipients
Military personnel from West Virginia
American Civil War recipients of the Medal of Honor